Md. Abu Sayed Siddique is a retired Major General of Bangladesh Army. He was the Master General of Ordnance of Bangladesh Army and the 8th Colonel Commandant of the Corps of Ordnance.

Career
Md Abu Sayed Siddique, was born on 1 January 1967. He was a cadet of Rangpur Cadet College. After completing his Higher Secondary Certificate examination he joined Bangladesh Military Academy (BMA) and after completion of military training, he was commissioned with the 15th BMA Long Course as a Second Lieutenant in the Corps of Ordnance.

He has completed Masters of Defence Studies and Masters of War Studies from Bangladesh National University. He has also completed PhD on “Public Procurement in Bangladesh” from Department of Public Administration at Jahangirnagar University, Savar, Dhaka. His writings on “Public Procurement” have been published in reputed National Newspapers. He has also completed the Capstone Course on national security and strategic studies from National Defence College (NDC) in 2018. He has experience of working for thirty five years in the field of procurement and budget management. During the service, he had carried out numbers of government contractual negotiations with the national and the international bidders, procurement officials and consultants. He has also experience of government to government procurement contract and negotiations with many countries. Presently he is serving as Master General of the Ordnance of Bangladesh Army in Army Headquarters.

Siddique was member of the Board of Trustee of Bangladesh Army University of Science and Technology. He was also a syndicate member of Bangladesh University of Professionals (BUP) and the Chairperson of the Jolshiri Abashon Project. He signed an agreement with Bashundhara Group over Jolshiri Abashon project on 2 September 2020.

References

Living people
Bangladesh Army generals
1967 births
Bangladeshi military personnel